Anima - Symphonie phantastique is a 1981 Austrian drama film directed by Titus Leber. It was shown out of competition at the 1981 Cannes Film Festival.

Cast
 Mathieu Carrière - Bachelor
 Charo López - Anima
 Bruno Anthony - Anima (Male)
 Marquis DeFrigance - Duchamp
 August Schuschnigg - Childman
 Christian Renaud - Scientist

References

External links

1981 films
1981 drama films
Films directed by Titus Leber
Austrian drama films